Schloss Meseberg is a Baroque palace in the north of Brandenburg, in Oberhavel, Germany which is the retreat of the Chancellor of Germany and the official state guest house of the German Federal Government. It is situated in an estate near the town of Gransee southeast of the  lake.

History

Built by the  family in 1739 to replace a previous building on the site that had burnt down, the Schloss passed to the von der Gröben family in the second half of the century. In 1774, the property and adjacent land parcels including three neighboring estates were purchased by Prince Henry of Prussia, who resided in nearby Rheinsberg Palace, and one year later were gifted to his paramour, Christian Ludwig von Kaphengst (1740-1800). In this way Heinrich complied with the command of his brother, King Frederick II, to remove Kaphengst from the court at Rheinsberg. Kaphengst furnished and decorated the palace lavishly, commissioning ceiling frescoes from Bernhard Rode, including one depicting an apotheosis of Heinrich. The estate grew with the construction of additional buildings, including the stables. Under Kaphengst and his successors, the Baroque garden was extended, and an English garden edging most of the lake shore was landscaped by Peter Joseph Lenné.

The property was later purchased by the Lessing family, owners of the Berlin newspaper Vossische Zeitung. During the Nazi era, it was forcibly acquired by Hermann Göring, only to be appropriated by the Soviet occupation in 1945. The East German government used it to house a grocery store and school rooms, which preserved it from demolition. A plan to renovate the dilapidated palace and turn it into a conference center for the Academy of Sciences was never realized.

Following the reunification of Germany the estate was bought by the Messerschmitt Foundation in 1995. The foundation, devoted to preserving historical landmarks, spent 11 years and more than $30 million renovating the stucco building, with its Ionic half-columns and high mansard roof.

In 2004, the Messerschmitt Foundation agreed to lease the palace to the Federal German Government for 20 years, for a symbolic annual rent of one euro. The government subsequently spent $17 million to install security and communications equipment and period furniture and paintings. Since 2007, it has been the retreat of the Chancellor of Germany (as Chequers is for the Prime Minister of the United Kingdom and Camp David for the President of the United States). The government regularly holds its cabinet conclave at Meseberg. Chancellor Angela Merkel hosts many state guests at Meseberg. From 2015 to 2018, however, the venue was used only eight days a year on average, including two annual public events (an open house and a Christmas tree lighting ceremony).

In their so-called Meseberg Declaration, Merkel and President Emmanuel Macron of France publicly committed themselves in 2018 to a partnership aimed at reinvigorating European integration.

Facilities

The palace basement once housed the kitchen of the local agricultural cooperative. Today it houses the chancellor's wine bar, with seats for 30 guests.

Visits of foreign dignitaries (selection)

First term of Chancellor Angela Merkel
 23 February 2007 – Visit of Jacques Chirac and Philippe Douste-Blazy of France
 20 April 2007 – Dinner with Václav Klaus of the Czech Republic (alongside former President Roman Herzog of Germany)
 23 April 2007 – Visit of José Manuel Durão Barroso of Portugal (in his capacity as President of the European Commission)
 17 May 2007 – Dinner with Lech Kaczyński of Poland
 15 June 2007 – Meeting with Jan Peter Balkenende of the Netherlands
 17 June 2007 – Lunch with Mirek Topolánek of the Czech Republic
 10 September 2007 – Visit of Nicolas Sarkozy and Bernard Kouchner of France
 20 November 2007 – Visit of Romano Prodi of Italy
 10 June 2008 – Visit of George W. Bush and Laura Bush of the United States
 11 February 2008 – Dinner with Ehud Olmert of Israel

Second term of Chancellor Angela Merkel
 25 November 2009 – Meeting with José Luis Rodríguez Zapatero of Spain
 4–5 June 2010 – Visit of Dmitry Medvedev of Russia
 5 October 2010 – Dinner with Wen Jiabao of China
 25 January 2011 – Dinner with José Manuel Durão Barroso of Portugal (in his capacity as President of the European Commission)
 30 November 2011 – Dinner with Jens Stoltenberg of Norway
 19 January 2012 – Dinner with Pedro Passos Coelho of Portugal, Fredrik Reinfeldt of Sweden and Werner Faymann of Austria
 13 February 2012 – Dinner with Helle Thorning-Schmidt of Denmark, Andrus Ansip of Estonia and Mark Rutte of the Netherlands
 23 February 2012 – Dinner with Enda Kenny of Ireland, Petr Nečas of the Czech Republic and Valdis Dombrovskis of Latvia
 12–13 April 2013 – Visit of David Cameron and Samantha Cameron of the United Kingdom
 26 May 2013 – Dinner with Li Keqiang of China

Third term of Chancellor Angela Merkel
 31 August 2015 – Visit of Mariano Rajoy of Spain
 4 May 2016 – Visit of Shinzō Abe and Akie Abe of Japan
 9 May 2016 – Visit of Mohammed bin Zayed Al Nahyan and Abdullah bin Zayed Al Nahyan of the United Arab Emirates
 11 July 2016 – Reception for the Diplomatic Corps with Apostolic Nuncio Nikola Eterović
 12 July 2016 – Meeting with Jarosław Kaczyński, Adam Bielan and Zdzisław Krasnodębski of Poland
 18 August 2016 – Visit of Donald Tusk of Poland (in his capacity as President of the European Council)
 26 August 2016 – Dinner with Stefan Löfven of Sweden, Lars Løkke Rasmussen of Denmark, Mark Rutte of the Netherlands and Juha Sipilä of Finland
 27 August 2016 – Meeting with Boyko Borissov of Bulgaria, Miro Cerar of Slovenia, Christian Kern of Austria and Tihomir Orešković of Croatia
 20 May 2017 – Visit of Petro Poroshenko of Ukraine
 25 May 2016 – Cabinet retreat with Taavi Rõivas of Estonia
 30 May 2017 – Visit of Narendra Modi of India
 13 July 2017 – Reception for the Diplomatic Corps with Apostolic Nuncio Nikola Eterović

Fourth term of Chancellor Angela Merkel
 10 April 2018 – Cabinet retreat with Jean-Claude Juncker of Luxembourg (in his capacity as President of the European Commission) and Jens Stoltenberg of Norway (in his capacity as Secretary General of NATO)
 19 June 2018 – Franco-German Ministerial Council with Emmanuel Macron of France
 6 July 2018 – Reception for the Diplomatic Corps with Apostolic Nuncio Nikola Eterović
 15 August 2018 – Dinner with Mahamadou Issoufou of Niger
 18 August 2018 – Visit of Vladimir Putin of Russia
 29 June 2020 – Visit of Emmanuel Macron of France
 13 July 2020 – Visit of Giuseppe Conte of Italy
 10 November 2021 – Dinner with António Costa of Portugal and Krišjānis Kariņš of Latvia

Chancellor Olaf Scholz
 3 May 2022 – Cabinet retreat with Magdalena Andersson of Sweden and Sanna Marin of Finland
 30 August 2022 – Cabinet retreat with Pedro Sánchez of Spain

See also 
 List of Baroque residences

References

External links
 
  (German)

Buildings and structures in Oberhavel
Palaces in Brandenburg
Official residences in Germany
Federal Government of Germany
State guesthouses
Buildings and structures completed in 1739
1739 establishments in Prussia